A  was originally a square wooden box used to measure rice in Japan during the feudal period. In 1885 Japan signed the Convention du Mètre and in 1886 converted all of its traditional measures to the metric system.

Masu existed in many sizes, typically covering the range from one   to one  . 

The advent of modern rice cookers and a higher calorie diet in Japan has made them impractical for measuring portions of rice. 
Today masu are largely used for drinking sake. Drinking vessels are made from hinoki (Japanese Cypress wood), as it imparts a special scent and flavor. The drinker sips from the corner of the box, which pours it into the mouth.Toasts are poured by stacking a pyramid of the guests' masu on a towel or cloth, with the toastmaker's masu on top. It is then overflowed until it fills all the masu beneath it. This symbolizes the generosity of the toaster to their friends and how they wish to share their happiness and good fortune with them.
Sanjakumasu (measure equal to 3 shaku [54ml]) = Often used in bars to hold a 50ml shotglass, which is then filled to overflowing to make up the difference. If the shotglass is used for sake, it is served chilled or at room-temperature. The sanjakumasu can also be used in the san san kudo wedding ceremony in the place of the sakazuki (sake dish).
Goshakumasu (measure equal to 5 shaku [90ml]) = Holds a half gō measure.
Hasshakumasu (measure equal to 8 shaku or 4/5 gō [144ml]) = The former standard masu size, probably because 8 is a lucky number.
Ichigōmasu (measure equal to 1 gō [180ml]) = The modern standard masu size, equal to a measure of 1 gō (0.18039 L) or 10 shaku.
Nigōhanmasu (measure equal to 2.5 gō [450ml.]) = Holds a quarter shō measure.
Gogōmasu (measure equal to 5 gō [900ml]) = Holds a half shō measure.
Isshōmasu (measure equal to 1 shō or 10 gō [1.8L]) = Holds a full shō measure.

A small , lidded form of masu, is sold for serving pepper, salt, sugar, and other dry condiments at the table.

See also
 Sake set
 Japanese units of measurement

References

External links

Sake Traditions

Japanese culture
Obsolete units of measurement
Units of volume
Human-based units of measurement
Origami
Sake
Standards of Japan